Ole Højgaard Bryrup (born 12 February 1955) is a Danish former footballer who played as a defender. He made five appearances for the Denmark national team in 1979.

References

1955 births
Living people
People from Nørresundby
People from Aalborg Municipality
Danish men's footballers
Association football defenders
Denmark international footballers
Kjøbenhavns Boldklub players
Hellerup IK players
Sportspeople from the North Jutland Region